Paul Fioroni (born August 7, 1976) is a Canadian former professional ice hockey player.

Career
Fioroni attended Sir Winston Churchill High School in Calgary, Alberta.
Fioroni also attended College at Olds College School of Business

Paul Fioroni made a name for himself early as he was a highly touted, true power forward leaving the Chilliwack Chiefs of the BCHL. He was a rare member of the 30/30 Club in Junior hockey play where the player amasses 30 goals and 30 fighting majors in a single season. Fioroni was able to take his power forward skills to the professional ranks where he continued to build up his resume. Fioroni began his professional career in 1997 playing in the Western Professional Hockey League (WPHL) with both the Lake Charles Ice Pirates and the Odessa Jackalopes during the 1997-98 season. His rookie season he led the league in not only fighting majors, but also penalty minutes. He went on to play ten seasons of professional hockey, including his final five years with the Lubbock Cotton Kings of the Central Hockey League (CHL). He had multiple NHL camp assignments with both IHL and AHL pre-season game involvement. Fioroni won a World Championship with the St. Louis Vipers of the RHI. Fioroni retired as the Cotton King's player assistant coach and captain following the 2005–06 CHL season to become the head coach of the Texas Tech University ice hockey team.

In 2003, while playing with the Lubbock Cotton Kings, Fioroni founded the 24 Foundation, a charitable organization which raises money for children with medical needs. In recognition of his “strong leadership qualities on and off the ice, while making significant and noteworthy humanitarian contributions to his community”, Fioroni was named the CHL Man of the Year for both the 2004–05 and 2005–06 seasons, becoming the only two-time winner of this award in the history of the CHL.

Awards and honours

References

External links

1976 births
Living people
Canadian ice hockey left wingers
Dallas Stars personnel
Ice hockey people from Ontario
Lake Charles Ice Pirates players
Lubbock Cotton Kings players
Minnesota Wild personnel
Mobile Mysticks players
Odessa Jackalopes players
Port Huron Border Cats players
Sportspeople from Mississauga
St. Louis Vipers players